Kanjia Lake is a natural lake on the northern outskirts of Bhubaneswar, Odisha, India. It has a rich biodiversity and is a wetland of national importance which is helpful for maintaining the city's ecology.

The lake's ecosystem consists of 37 species of birds, 20 species of reptiles, 10 species of amphibians, 46 species of fish and three species of prawns, 10 species of sub-merged macrophytes, 14 species of floating macrophytes and 24 species of emergent macrophytes.

The lake is facing threat from uncontrolled quarrying, the dumping of solid waste and haphazard real estate construction on its fringe areas.

The lake is a part of the Nandankanan Zoological Park and is used for recreational boating by visitors.

References

Geography of Bhubaneswar
Lakes of Odisha
Wetlands of India